Doris Posch (born 1 April 1973) is a track and road cyclist from Austria. She represented her nation at the 2001 and 2002 UCI Road World Championships. She has won the Austrian National Time Trial Championships six times.

References

External links
 profile at Procyclingstats.com

1973 births
Austrian female cyclists
Living people
People from Imst District
Sportspeople from Tyrol (state)
20th-century Austrian women